Picture show is another name for films, mostly used in the USA.

Picture show may also refer to:

 Picture Show (album), a 2012 album by Neon Trees
 Picture Show (magazine), a British film magazine
 Ed, Edd n Eddy's Big Picture Show, a 2009 animated road television film
 "Picture Show Life", a song from the Ringo Starr's album Old Wave